Margaret Campbell Macpherson (1860 – May 16, 1931) was a Canadian artist born in St. John's, Newfoundland and Labrador. Macpherson was well known for her various works of paintings in Scotland. Macpherson later died in Versailles, France.

Early life 
Macpherson grew up in St John's, Newfoundland, and moved to Edinburgh to study painting.

Career 
Between 1880 and 1884, Macpherson studied in Switzerland, with the artist Auguste-Henri Berthoud. In 1885, she returned to Edinburgh and exhibited at the Royal Scottish Academy for the first time. Macpherson began to exhibit her work at the Glasgow Institute of the Fine Arts from 1887 onwards.

In 1889, Macpherson moved to Paris. Once there, she trained under Gustave Courtois and Pascal Dagnan-Bouveret at the Academie Colarossi. Whilst in France, Macpherson also worked at the artists' colony of Concarneau during 1891, where she  began to specialise in paintings of girls in traditional Breton costume.

Macpherson was dividing her time between France and Scotland, where she had a successful career as a portrait painter. She shared a studio in Edinburgh with another artist, Josephine Hoxie Bartlett. Macpherson and Bartlett became members of the Society of Scottish Artists in 1892. Macpherson and Bartlett had a joint exhibition in Edinburgh in 1895. They moved permanently to Paris in 1899.

Throughout her career the following art societies all accepted paintings by Macpherson
 Royal Scottish Academy
 Glasgow Institute of Fine Art 
 Society of Scottish Artists
 Société Nationale des Beaux-Arts 
 Royal Academy, London
 Société des Artistes Français

Awards 
 Bronze medal - Exposition universelle, Paris, in 1900 
 Gold medal - Exposition nationale, Reims, in 1903 
 Gold medal - Exposition internationale, Nantes, in 1904

References 

Canadian women painters
1860 births
1931 deaths
Artists from Newfoundland and Labrador
People from St. John's, Newfoundland and Labrador
Académie Colarossi alumni
Canadian portrait artists